Cavalcade of the West is a 1936 American Western film directed by Harry L. Fraser.

Plot
When a family misses the rendezvous for a wagon train they venture on their own to join it. They are ambushed by three outlaws who murder the father, knock out the mother and steal one of the two boys for themselves.

As the years go by, the remaining brother, Clint, and his mother, are looked after by others in the community with Clint making a living breaking and selling horses while the kidnapped brother Asa becomes an outlaw known as Ace Carter, presumably under the tutelage of his kidnappers. When the Pony Express is created, both brothers, their relationship unknown to each other, attempt to join as riders. Clint is accepted for the most dangerous route whilst Ace is rejected. Ace revenges himself by robbing the mail from his brother, and by robbing a stagecoach. The robbery of which Clint is suspected. Clint tracks down Ace and discovers him to be his long-lost brother. And when townsmen arrive to "string up" Ace for the robbery, Clint faces a tough choice.

Cast
Hoot Gibson ... Clint Knox
Rex Lease  ... Ace Carter AKA Asa Knox
Marion Shilling ... Mary Christman
Adam Goodman ... Windy Harper
Nina Guilbert ... Mrs Martha Knox
Earl Dwire  ... George Christman
Phil Dunham ... Reporter
Robert McKenzie ... Judge
Steve Clark ... John Knox
Jerry Tucker ... Clint as a young boy
Barry Downing ... Asa as a young boy

External links

1936 films
American black-and-white films
1936 Western (genre) films
Works about the Pony Express
Grand National Films films
American Western (genre) films
Films set in the 1860s
1930s English-language films
1930s American films